Mark Lutz is the name of:

 Mark Lutz (athlete) (born 1951), US American sprinter
 Mark Lutz (actor) (born 1970), Canadian-born actor
 Mark A. Lutz (born 1941), Swiss-born economics professor
 Mark Lutz (1901–1968), model and longtime friend of Carl Van Vechten